Nikolaevsk School is a kindergarten through twelfth grade school in Nikolaevsk, Alaska.  It is in a Russian Old Believer community on the Kenai Peninsula and is a member of the Kenai Peninsula Borough School District.

The school mascot is the warrior. It has approximately seventy students and teachers in total. Michael Sellers is the current principal.

References

External links
Official website

Public K-12 schools in Alaska
Schools in Kenai Peninsula Borough, Alaska